Central Slovakia is one of the four NUTS-2 Regions of Slovakia. It was created at the same time as were the Žilina and the Banská Bystrica  regions.  Central Slovakia is the largest of the four regions of Slovakia and its GDP per capita is 61% of the European Union average (€18,200 per year).

References

NUTS 2 statistical regions of Slovakia
NUTS 2 statistical regions of the European Union